An annular solar eclipse will occur on July 1, 2057. A solar eclipse occurs when the Moon passes between Earth and the Sun, thereby totally or partly obscuring the image of the Sun for a viewer on Earth. An annular solar eclipse occurs when the Moon's apparent diameter is smaller than the Sun's, blocking most of the Sun's light and causing the Sun to look like an annulus (ring). An annular eclipse appears as a partial eclipse over a region of the Earth thousands of kilometres wide.

Related eclipses

Solar eclipses 2054–2058

Saros 147

Tritos series

Metonic series

References

External links 
 NASA graphics

2057 7 1
2057 in science
2057 7 1
2057 7 1